

202001–202100 

|-id=092
| 202092 Algirdas ||  || Algirdas (1296–1377), a monarch of medieval Lithuania. || 
|-id=093
| 202093 Jogaila ||  || Jogaila, later Władysław II Jagiełło (1348–1434) was the Grand Duke of Lithuania (1377–1434) and then the King of Poland (1386–1434). He joined two states that became the leading power of eastern Europe and was the founder of Poland's Jagiellon dynasty. || 
|}

202101–202200 

|-bgcolor=#f2f2f2
| colspan=4 align=center | 
|}

202201–202300 

|-bgcolor=#f2f2f2
| colspan=4 align=center | 
|}

202301–202400 

|-id=373
| 202373 Ubuntu ||  || Ubuntu, a philosophy focusing on people's relations with each other, emphasizes unity. Its origin is in the native languages of southern Africa and it is one of the founding principles of the new South Africa || 
|}

202401–202500 

|-bgcolor=#f2f2f2
| colspan=4 align=center | 
|}

202501–202600 

|-bgcolor=#f2f2f2
| colspan=4 align=center | 
|}

202601–202700 

|-id=605
| 202605 Shenchunshan ||  || Shen Chun-shan (1932–2018), Chinese physicist and president of the National Tsing Hua University in Taiwan || 
|-id=614
| 202614 Kayleigh ||  || Kayleigh Lucille Stamp (1996–2010), the eldest granddaughter of the Australian discoverer David R. Herald || 
|-id=686
| 202686 Birkfellner ||  || Wolfgang Birkfellner (born 1970), an Austrian medical physicist and amateur astronomer. || 
|}

202701–202800 

|-id=704
| 202704 Utena ||  || Utena, city in north-east Lithuania || 
|-id=736
| 202736 Julietclare ||  || Juliet Clare Datson (born 1980), astronomer, former student of the Max Planck Institute for Astronomy in Heidelberg, Germany || 
|-id=740
| 202740 Vicsympho ||  || Victoria Symphony, Canadian orchestra based in Victoria, British Columbia || 
|-id=778
| 202778 Dmytria ||  || Dmytro Yatskiv (1963–2004), laser physicist and observer at Kyiv satellite laser ranging station || 
|-id=784
| 202784 Gangkeda ||  || Gangkeda, the Mandarin Chinese Pinyin abbreviation for the Hong Kong University of Science and Technology (Xiānggǎng Kējì Dàxué), which was founded in 1991 || 
|-id=787
| 202787 Kestecher || 2008 OG || Natalie Kestecher (born 1961), Australian radio producer || 
|}

202801–202900 

|-id=806
| 202806 Sierrastars ||  || Sierra Stars Observatory , located in Markleeville, California || 
|-id=819
| 202819 Carlosanchez ||  || Carlos Sánchez Magro (1944–1985), Spanish astrophysicist and pioneer in infrared astronomy || 
|}

202901–203000 

|-id=909
| 202909 Jakoten ||  || Jakoten, a traditional Japanese food || 
|-id=930
| 202930 Ivezic ||  || Željko Ivezić (born 1965), a Croatian-American astrophysicist, telescope builder for the Sloan Digital Sky Survey (SDDS)  and a principal author of the SDSS Moving Object Catalogue || 
|}

References 

202001-203000